Terry G. Jordan-Bychkov (1938–2003; also published as Terry G. Jordan) was a professor at the Department of Geography and the Environment at University of Texas at Austin and a specialist in the cultural and historical geography of the United States. He authored several influential scholarly books and articles and a widely adopted introductory textbook. Jordan-Bychkov served as president of the American Association of Geographers (AAG) in 1987 and 1988.

Early life and education
Jordan-Bychkov was born on August 9, 1938, in Dallas, Texas, and grew up in University Park, Texas, where he attended Highland Park High School. He majored in geography and German at Southern Methodist University, graduating in 1960. He earned a master's degree at the University of Texas in 1961, and a Ph.D. at the University of Wisconsin in 1965. His doctoral dissertation, German Seed in Texas Soil, focused on German settlers in Texas.

Career
He began his career as an associate professor at Arizona State University Tempe campus, where he was an assistant professor of geography from 1965 to 1969. He served as geography department chair at North Texas State University (now the University of North Texas) from 1969 to 1982. In 1982 he became the Walter Prescott Webb professor of geography at the University of Texas at Austin, where he taught for the rest of his life.

He was elected vice president of the AAG in 1986, and president on April 9, 1987. He was a member of the Pioneer America Society, Texas State Historical Association, Texas Folklore Society, Texas Institute of Letters, and Phi Beta Kappa.

Personal life
He married Marlis Anderson in 1962, and Bella Bychkova in 1997. He died of pancreatic cancer at his home in Austin, Texas, on October 16, 2003. A classroom in the department where he taught is named in his honor.

Notable publications
2003, The upland South: The making of an American folk region and landscape. Santa Fe, NM: Center for American Places, and Charlottesville: University of Virginia Press
1997, The Mountain West: Interpreting the Folk Landscape (co-author,)
1993, North American cattle ranching frontiers: Origins, diffusion, and differentiation. Albuquerque: University of New Mexico Press
1989, (with M. Kaups). The American backwoods frontier: An ethnic and ecological interpretation Baltimore: Johns Hopkins University Press
1985, American Log Buildings: An Old World Heritage
1982, Texas graveyards: A cultural legacy. Austin: University of Texas Press
1981, Trails to Texas: Southern Roots of Western Cattle Ranching
1978, Texas log buildings: A folk architecture. Austin: University of Texas Press
1966, German seed in Texas soil: Immigrant farmers in nineteenth century Texas Austin: University of Texas Press
1964, Between the forest and the prairie. Agricultural History 38:205-16. Reprinted in Geographic perspectives on America's past: Readings on the historical geography of the United States, ed. David Ward, 50–60. New York: Oxford University Press, 1979

Awards
 Honors Award, Association of American Geographers, 1982
 Southern Teaching Career Fellowship, Council of Southern Universities
 Woodrow Wilson Fellowship

References

Further reading
 
 Jordan-Bychkov's Curriculum Vitae

American geographers
University of Texas at Austin faculty
2003 deaths
1938 births
Presidents of the American Association of Geographers
Historical geographers
Deaths from pancreatic cancer
Southern Methodist University alumni
University of Texas alumni
University of Wisconsin–Madison alumni
20th-century geographers